Chevez Ezaneh (born August 12, 1992) is a young Dene actor who has played characters who are Native Americans, including the young Charles Eastman in the HBO TV film Bury My Heart at Wounded Knee. Ezaneh won a Young Artist Award in 2008 for the "Best Performance in a TV Movie.

Appearances

External links

Living people
1992 births
21st-century First Nations people
Canadian male film actors
Canadian male television actors
Dene people
First Nations male actors